Exelmans is a station on line 9 of the Paris Métro. It owes its name to its proximity to boulevard Exelmans, which was in turn named after Rémi Joseph Isidore Exelmans (1775-1852), a general of Napoleon's cavalry.

History 
The station opened on 8 November 1922 with the opening of the initial section of the line from Trocadéro and served as its eastern terminus until the line was further extended to Porte de Saint-Cloud the following year.

As part of the "Renouveau du métro" programme by the RATP, the station's corridors was renovated and modernised on 11 December 2007. A small exhibit on the singer Claude François who had lived nearby in the past was also removed as part of the programme.

In 2019, the station was used by 2,102,492 passengers, making it the 239th busiest of the Métro network out of 302 stations.

In 2020, the station was used by 1,055,609 passengers amidst the COVID-19 pandemic, making it the 236th busiest of the Métro network out of 305 stations.

In 2021, the station was used by 1,607,223 passengers, making it the 219th busiest of the Métro network out of 305 stations.

Passenger services

Access 
The station has 3 accesses:

 Access 1: boulevard Exelmans
 Access 2: rue Michel-Ange (with a rare Val d'Osne totem)
 Access 3: rue Claude-Lorrain Hôpital Henry Dunant

Station layout

Platforms 
The station has a standard configuration with 2 tracks surrounded by 2 side platforms.

Other connections 
The station is also served by lines 62 (only in the direction of Porte de France) and  88  of  the RATP bus network.

Gallery

References

Roland, Gérard (2003). Stations de métro. D’Abbesses à Wagram. Éditions Bonneton.

Paris Métro stations in the 16th arrondissement of Paris
Railway stations in France opened in 1922
Paris Métro line 9